The minor duodenal papilla is the opening of the accessory pancreatic duct into the descending second section of the duodenum.

Structure
The minor duodenal papilla is contained within the second part of the duodenum. It is situated 2 cm proximal to the major duodenal papilla, and thus 5–8 cm from the opening of the pylorus. The gastroduodenal artery lies posterior.

Variation
The minor duodenal papilla may or may not contain a functioning sphincter and patent duct. When present, the sphincter is known as the sphincter of Helly, and the duct as the accessory pancreatic duct of Santorini. In 10% of people, the minor duodenal papilla is the prime duct for drainage of the pancreas, although in others it may not be present at all.

Pain from the region will be referred to the epigastric region of the abdomen due to its associated dermatomes.

Function
The duct is an embryological remnant, however in a small majority of people drains the pancreas.

Development
The minor duodenal papilla represents the remnants of the opening of the accessory pancreatic duct, which drains the dorsal pancreatic bud during foetal development.

Clinical significance
When patent, the minor duodenal papilla may be associated with recurrent pancreatitis. This is particularly common in a subset of people, when the dorsal pancreatic bud fails to fuse with the ventral pancreatic bud, a condition called pancreatic divisum,  or when patent and ligated.

History
The other names of minor duodenal papilla is Santorini's minor caruncle.

See also

References

External links
 

Pancreas anatomy